The Oppo Joy is the first in a short series of Oppo phones aimed at the budget segment of the smartphone market in India. These phones focused on delivering good battery life and cameras at the cost of other features.

References 

Joy
Mobile phones introduced in 2014
Android (operating system) devices
Discontinued smartphones
Mobile phones with user-replaceable battery